Dalcheon is a river of South Korea. It is a river of the Han River system. A tributary of the Namhan River, it is one of the few Namhan tributaries that are navigable year round.

References

Rivers of South Korea